Divine Lunga (born 28 May 1995) is a Zimbabwean footballer who plays as a defender for Golden Arrows on loan from Mamelodi Sundowns and the Zimbabwe national football team.

Club career

Early career
Lunga began playing football at the age of 9, joining Ajax Hotspurs of Mpopoma. He moved to Chicken Inn in 2012, playing for the Under-18 and B teams before moving to the first team.

Golden Arrows
In July 2018, Lunga joined South African club Lamontville Golden Arrows. He made his league debut for the club on 5 August 2018 in a 2-0 away victory over Maritzburg United. He scored his first competitive goal for the club on 14 April 2019 in a 1-1 draw with AmaZulu F.C. His goal, assisted by Richard Matloga, was scored in the 18th minute and made the score 1-1. Following his performances in the 2019 Africa Cup of Nations, there was reported interest in Lunga from several French and Belgian clubs, namely K.R.C. Genk.

Mamelodi Sundows
In July 2021, Lunga was announced as new Mamelodi Sundowns player.

International career
Lunga made his senior international debut on 21 June 2015 in a 2-0 victory over Comoros during 2016 African Nations Championship qualification. He was included in Zimbabwe's 2019 Africa Cup of Nations squad, playing in their matches against Egypt and Uganda.

References

External links

1995 births
Living people
Zimbabwean footballers
Chicken Inn F.C. players
Lamontville Golden Arrows F.C. players
Mamelodi Sundowns F.C. players
Zimbabwe Premier Soccer League players
South African Premier Division players
Zimbabwe international footballers
Association football defenders
2019 Africa Cup of Nations players
Zimbabwean expatriate footballers
Expatriate soccer players in South Africa
Zimbabwean expatriate sportspeople in South Africa